Patrick Warburton (born November 14, 1964) is an American actor. 
On television, he has played David Puddy on Seinfeld, the title character on The Tick, Jeb Denton on Less Than Perfect, Jeff Bingham on Rules of Engagement and Lemony Snicket on A Series of Unfortunate Events. His voice acting roles include Joe Swanson on Family Guy, Kronk in The Emperor's New Groove, Buzz Lightyear on Buzz Lightyear of Star Command, Ian in Open Season, Blag in The Wild, Ken in Bee Movie, King Agamemnon in Mr. Peabody & Sherman, Pulaski in Planes: Fire & Rescue, Sheriff Bronson Stone in Scooby-Doo! Mystery Incorporated, Mr. Barkin on Kim Possible, Brock Samson on The Venture Bros., Flynn in Skylanders and Hugo Vasquez in Tales from the Borderlands. In advertising, he plays a "control enthusiast" in commercials for National Car Rental.

Early life
Patrick Warburton was born in Paterson, New Jersey on November 14, 1964. He is the son of orthopedic surgeon John Charles Warburton Jr. and Barbara Jeanne Gratz (an actress credited as Barbara Lord). He and his three sisters, Mary, Lara, and Megan, were raised in a "very religious" and "conservative" Catholic family in Huntington Beach, California, where he attended Saints Simon and Jude Catholic School. He later attended Servite High School (in Anaheim, California), then transferred to Newport Harbor High School (in Newport Beach, California). He studied marine biology at Orange Coast College in Costa Mesa, California, but dropped out to pursue modeling and acting.

Career
Warburton's acting roles often rely on his distinctive deep, booming voice and large physique. In the 1990s, he was known for his recurring role in Seinfeld as David Puddy, the on-again, off-again boyfriend of Elaine Benes. He played Eric in the sitcom Dave's World, and had a small role in the 2002 film Men in Black II as J's new partner, T.

Warburton played the title role in FOX's short-lived series The Tick. He has repeatedly criticized FOX's mismanagement of the series after its cancellation, stating that the network "apparently didn't have a clue". In 2016 he was a producer for the Amazon streaming version of the series.

He played Nick Sharp in 8 Simple Rules; and in 2003, joined the cast of Less Than Perfect as anchorman Jeb Denton. He also played Jeff Bingham in Rules of Engagement, and Rip Riley in the FX series Archer.

Warburton has provided voices for several animated films and TV programs, including a lead character in Game Over, Buzz Lightyear; the Little Green Men in Buzz Lightyear of Star Command; and Kronk in The Emperor's New Groove, with David Spade, Eartha Kitt, and John Goodman. Spade and Warburton reunited for the CBS sitcom Rules of Engagement, which aired from 2007 to 2013, and Joe Dirt 2: Beautiful Loser in 2015. Warburton reprised his role as Kronk for the direct-to-video sequel Kronk's New Groove, and the subsequent TV series The Emperor's New School. He voiced Steve Barkin in the Disney Channel show Kim Possible.

Warburton was also cast in The Venture Bros., where he voices Brock Samson, and voices Joe Swanson on Fox's Family Guy and Detective Cash in The Batman. He recorded voices for the computer-animated feature films Hoodwinked, Chicken Little, Bee Movie, Open Season. In video games, he voiced Lok in the Tak and the Power of Juju video game series and has also reprised the role again in the television series of the same name, as well as Flynn in the Skylanders series. He was also the voice of Commander Blaine H. Tate on the Comedy Central animated series Moonbeam City in October 2015.

Warburton appeared on GSN's Poker Royale Celebrities vs. the Pros tournament in 2005, winning the tournament and the $50,000 grand prize. On November 8, 2009, he appeared as the Wild West character Cal Johnson on Seth & Alex's (Almost Live) Comedy Show, hosted by Seth MacFarlane and Alex Borstein on Fox. He was also cast as Sheriff Bronson Stone in the Cartoon Network series Scooby-Doo! Mystery Incorporated, and appeared as Bowser in a video by CollegeHumor, "The Roast of Mario".

He appeared on the American version of Top Gear on February 21, 2012, where he set the "Big Star, Small Car" lap record, beating previous record-holder Arlene Tur.

Warburton starred in the 2016 NBC sitcom Crowded, where he and Carrie Preston played parents who were about to enjoy their empty-nest years only to find their daughters and his parents moving back in to live with them. It ran for one season of 13 episodes.

He is featured as the flight attendant, Patrick, in the "preboarding" video shown to guests at Soarin' Around the World in Disney California Adventure in Anaheim, California and Epcot at the Walt Disney World Resort, in Orlando, Florida where he explains the ride's requirements, reprising his role from the preboarding video of the predecessor ride, Soarin' Over California. He lent his voice to the droid G2-4T in the queue of Star Tours: The Adventures Continue at Disney's Hollywood Studios in Orlando, Florida and Disneyland in Anaheim, California.

He starred as Lemony Snicket in the Netflix comedy drama series A Series of Unfortunate Events.

Despite being a lifelong fan of the Los Angeles Kings hockey team, Warburton has appeared at multiple New Jersey Devils games with his face (and chest) painted similar to that of his Devils crazed role in an episode of "Seinfeld", exhorting the crowd in a manner like that of his David Puddy character. His real-life relationship with the Devils began when the team invited him to drop the ceremonial first puck of the 1995 season, and he showed up with his face painted. After dropping the puck, he slipped and fell, but rescued the moment by regaining his balance and ripping off his shirt to reveal his chest was painted with the letter "D", which came to be regarded as an iconic moment in Devils history. The Devils gave out a Puddy bobblehead doll to fans at a 2019 game.

In the commercial and advertising world, Warburton is the voice in the Carrier Corporation commercials for their air-conditioning and HVAC units, and was the voice of Superman in The Adventures of Seinfeld and Superman for American Express. He is the voice of Lewis in the "Clark & Lewis Expedition" radio commercials for Horizon Air. In August 2009, he played a high-end PC in a "Get a Mac" ad for Apple Inc. He became the spokesman for Japanese automaker Honda's "Good Reasons" advertising campaign in September 2011. He is the voice in NAPA's "Can of Know How" commercial. In 2015, he appeared in National Car Rental's "Be the Boss of You" commercials. He is the voice of the current "Discover Fresh" radio ad campaign by Souplantation, a California-based buffet-style restaurant chain (known as Sweet Tomatoes in other markets).

Warburton is also the voice of Ranger, a forest ranger, in a series of radio spots for the national Smokey Bear campaign sponsored by the U.S. Forest Service and the Ad Council.

In 2003, he appeared in the M&Ms commercial "You Don't Eat Your Own Kind".

Personal life
In 1991, Warburton married Cathy Jennings, whom he met in college. They have three sons and one daughter. They live in Santa Rosa Valley, California.

Warburton is a Christian, and has said that he is willing to turn off Family Guy "when it takes its religious humor too far", perceiving such moments "as diminished returns".

Warburton is a "lifelong conservative" but admits to having "very liberal views" on other issues.

Filmography

Film

Television

Video games

Web

Theme parks

Awards and nominations

Notes

References

External links
 
 
 
 Fletch Takes On "The Puddy", 2004 interview by Clint Fletcher on filmmonthly.com; accessed October 31, 2014.

1964 births
Living people
20th-century American male actors
21st-century American male actors
Actors from Paterson, New Jersey
American male film actors
American male television actors
American male video game actors
American male voice actors
Male actors from Huntington Beach, California
Male actors from New Jersey
Servite High School alumni
American Christians
American Catholics
American people of Irish descent